Pediatric Anesthesia is a peer-reviewed scientific journal published by John Wiley and Sons covering research on the use of anesthetics in children. The current editor-in-chief is Andrew Davidson (University of Melbourne).

Abstracting and indexing
The journal is abstracted and indexed in:

According to the Journal Citation Reports, the journal has an impact factor of 2.556 in 2020.

References

External links
 

Monthly journals
Publications established in 1991
English-language journals
Pediatrics journals
Wiley (publisher) academic journals
Anesthesiology and palliative medicine journals